Mohammad Abu Fani (or Mohamad Abo-Fani, ; born 27 April 1998) is an Israeli professional footballer who plays as a midfielder for Israeli Premier League club Maccabi Haifa and the Israel national team.

Early life
Abu Fani was born in Kafr Qara, Israel, to a Muslim-Arab family. His father Sami Abu Fani, a former local footballer, supported Mohammad’s football career from a young age. Mohammad has 2 sisters, Rawan and Lareen.

Club career
On 13 May 2017 Abu Fani made his debut for Maccabi Haifa in a 0–1 loss to Bnei Sakhnin, coming in as a substitute at the 46th minute. At youth level, Abu Fani was part of the Maccabi Haifa U-21 team which won two consecutive championships, in 2015–16 and 2016–17, as well as reaching the UEFA Youth League play off stage.

International career
Since youth, he played for both the U19 and the U21 national teams of Israel, appearing in 18 matches, and scoring 3 goals (U19 only).

He made his senior debut for Israel on 8 October 2020 in a UEFA Euro 2020 qualifying play-offs away match against Scotland.

Honours
Maccabi Haifa
 Israeli Premier League: 2020–21, 2021–22
 Israeli Toto Cup: 2021–22
 Israel Super Cup: 2021

External links

References

1998 births
Living people
Israeli footballers
Arab citizens of Israel
Arab-Israeli footballers
Maccabi Haifa F.C. players
Hapoel Ramat Gan F.C. players
Hapoel Hadera F.C. players
Israeli Premier League players
Liga Leumit players
Israel youth international footballers
Israel under-21 international footballers
Israel international footballers
People from Kafr Qara
Association football midfielders
Israeli Muslims